The city of Ottawa, Canada held municipal elections on December 6, 1937.

Mayor of Ottawa

Ottawa Board of Control
(4 elected)

* The city clerk cast the deciding vote for McRae.

Ottawa City Council
(2 elected from each ward)

References
Ottawa Citizen, December 7, 1937

Municipal elections in Ottawa
1937 elections in Canada
1930s in Ottawa
1937 in Ontario
December 1937 events